Nico Audy-Rowland is a French musician, originally from Saint Barthélemy in the Caribbean. He is founder of experimental rock band, Trocadero.

Born in Saint Barthélemy, he moved to the US as a teenager. He has also been involved in writing theme and incidental music for Red vs. Blue, and has contributed remotely to the soundtrack for many years. He also contributed music to the movie Lazer Team and the series, RWBY.

He currently lives in Seattle.

References

External links 

 

French multi-instrumentalists
People from Saint Barthélemy
Year of birth missing (living people)
Living people